John McPhillips is an Irish film music composer.

He won the Best Music Award in TV/Film for Spin the Bottle at the 1st Irish Film and Television Awards in 2003. He was the composer for the animated series Teenage Fairytale Dropouts, Hero: 108, the Oscar nominated short film Pentecost, and Handsome Devil. He composed the music for the 2014 Irish TV series "Trivia" currently accessible on Acorn TV.

References

External links

website

Living people
Irish film score composers
Male film score composers
Alumni of University College Dublin
Year of birth missing (living people)